Khan Khvodi (also Romanized as Khān Khvodī, Khānkhowdī, Khān-i-Khūdi; also known as Khāneh Khodī, Khaneh Khoori, Khāneh Khvodī, and Khān Khodrī) is a village in Beyarjomand Rural District, Beyarjomand District, Shahrud County, Semnan Province, Iran. At the 2006 census, its population was 394, in 150 families.

References 

Populated places in Shahrud County